Twin Sisters is a 1934 Chinese film directed by Zheng Zhengqiu.

Cast 
Hu Die, playing double roles as the twin sisters
Zheng Xiaoqiu as Tao Ge
Tan Zhiyuan as Father
Xuan Jinglin as Mother
Gu Meijun as Miss Qian
Xu Shenyuan as Governor Qian

External links 

1934 films
1930s Mandarin-language films
Chinese black-and-white films
Films based on Chinese novels
1934 drama films
Chinese drama films
Twins in fiction
Films about twin sisters